The International School Bangalore (TISB) is a private educational institution located on Sarjapura Varthur road in Bangalore, India. It was founded in 2000 by Dr. K. P. Gopalkrishna, and is a sister school to the National Public Schools, Bangalore. Students of TISB take the International General Certificate of Secondary Education (IGCSE) examinations at the end of the 10th grade, followed by a two-year IB syllabus. 

The school has adopted the curriculums of various countries: Grade 9 and 10 pass out through the IGCSE Curriculum, while grades 11 and 12 complete the 2-year course in the IB Diploma. 

TISB hosts an annual student-run cultural and academic fest, Vivum, which is one of India's largest student-led school fests.

TISB boasts both Day Schooling and Boarding, and is a Co-Ed Institution with constant updates and additions to the infrastructure, teaching facilities and instruments, ensuring a comfortable and friendly environment for efficient learning.

References

External links

 Official website

International schools in Bangalore
Cambridge schools in India
Private schools in Bangalore
Educational institutions established in 2000
2000 establishments in Karnataka